The taxonomy of the cone snails and their allies as proposed by John K. Tucker and Manuel J. Tenorio in 2009 was a biological classification system for a large group of predatory sea snails. This system was an attempt to make taxonomic sense of the large and diverse group which contains the family Conidae, the cone snails.
The authors proposed extensive changes to the family Conidae in contrast to the way the group was treated in the taxonomy of the Gastropoda by Bouchet & Rocroi, 2005. Bouchet and Rocroi included in the family Conidae several other groups of toxoglossan snails which had previously been placed in the Turridae.

For the over 600 recognized species of living cone snails, Tucker and Tenorio's classification system proposed 3 distinct families and 82 genera. The authors discussed in detail 89 genera and five families in total (that have the inner shell walls resorbed during growth), including fossil cone snail genera and snails which were previously traditionally classified as turrids. This classification was based upon shell morphology, radular differences, anatomy, physiology, cladistics, and an analysis of then published molecular phylogeny (DNA) studies.  The genera proposed by Tucker and Tenorio are recognized as an "alternate representation" by the World Register of Marine Species.  The authors further proposed a modification to the classification of Bouchet & Rocroi (2005) for ten additional Conoidea families (which do not resorb their inner walls) which included turrids which had been placed in the Conidae by Taylor, et al. in 1993.  This proposed taxonomic classification separated the turrid snails from the cone snails, which were considered to be a distinct and diverse group.

Cone snails and the genus problem
In 1758, Linnaeus, working only with shells, placed all the cone snails in a single genus  Conus.  In 1792, three genera were proposed by Hwass, five genera were proposed by Montfort in 1810, and then six genera by Kiener in 1845.  In 1874, H.C. Weinkauff proposed a system of seventeen genera for the 352 then-known species of cones. This system of classification was adopted by G. W. Tryon in 1884.

In the 1930s, Iredale proposed several new genera, followed by B. C. Cotton in 1945, with twenty-nine genera.  From 1956 onwards, Kuroda and other Japanese scientists introduced several additional new genera.  Ultimately dozens of genera and subgenera were being used.

In 1937, J.R. Tomlin advocated that all cone snail species should be placed in the single genus  Conus in the family Conidae, with the explanation that "the grouping of the Cones is as yet so little understood that I have made no attempt to deal with the growing number of subgenera and genera into which Conus has been dismembered."  In 1979, Jerry G. Walls emulated Tomlin by confining all species to the genus Conus, stating that "although many subgenera or genera have been devised for the cones, only the single genus Conus with no subgenera is recognized here." Subsequent experts in the field of cone snail taxonomy followed Tomlin and Walls, and retained all species of cones in the single genus  Conus, making the Conidae a monogeneric family.  This traditional Linnaean classification system,  placing all species of cones in the single genus Conus, continued for decades before a malacologist proposed a different classification system.

In 1991, A.J. da Motta published a new systematic classification of cone species at the generic level, incorporating all taxa previously named by other authors.  A.J. da Motta's classification system, which covered both extant and fossil species, was based primarily on the shape and contours of the body whorl of the shell, and attempted to make generic classification of cones possible in an objective manner.  This 1991 proposed classification used eight existing genera, Conus, Leptoconus, Dendroconus, Hermes, Profundiconus, Gastridium, Conasprella, and Cylinder, and sixty subgenera.  A.J. da Motta's proposed classification was however not generally accepted.

The last comprehensive treatise dealing with the family Conidae as a whole was the "Manual of the Living Conidae", by Röckel, Korn & Kohn (1995).  Only one genus, Conus, was used for the entire family, the authors stating that they considered there was still insufficient scientific data at that time to accurately define the diversity of the family.  The Conus Biodiversity Website, by Alan J. Kohn and Trevor Anderson, notes that there are more than 500 recognized extant species of Conus, out of 3,253 species names published between 1758 and 2007.  As of the date of The Conus Biodiversity Website's last update in October 2007, only the genus Conus is recognized for the entire family.

Modern taxonomic classifications
Molecular testing in order to try to understand the molecular phylogeny of the Conidae was initially begun by Christopher Meyer and Alan Kohn in 2005, and is continuing, particularly with the advent of nuclear DNA testing in addition to mDNA testing.   In modern taxonomic classifications, cladistical analyses are performed using traditionally accepted taxonomic characteristics, including morphology (shell shape has been used for over 250 years as the basis for classification), and modern techniques including  DNA analyses.  Such studies have been conducted on many groups of gastropods, including cone snails prior to the publication of Tucker and Tenorio's treatise.

Tucker and Tenorio’s 2009 proposed classification
Tucker and Tenorio's  2009 classification system for the cone shells and their allies (which resorb their inner walls during growth) was based on a cladistical analysis of anatomical characters, including the radular tooth, the morphology (i.e. shell characters), as well as an analysis of prior molecular phylogeny studies, all of which were used to construct phylogenetic trees.  In their phylogeny, Tucker and Tenorio noted the close relationship of the cone species within the various clades, corresponding to their proposed families and genera; this also corresponded to the results of prior molecular studies by Puillandre et al. and others.
 
Tucker and Tenorio's proposed classification system for the cone shells and their allies is shown below (note that genera that contain only fossil species are marked with †):

Family: Conidae Fleming, 1822 
Subfamily Coninae Fleming, 1822

Calibanus da Motta, 1991
Chelyconus Mörch, 1852
Conus Linnaeus, 1758
Cylinder Montfort, 1810
Darioconus Iredale, 1930
Endemoconus Iredale, 1931
Eugeniconus da Motta, 1991
Gastridium Modeer, 1793
Leptoconus Swainson, 1840
Nataliconus Tucker & Tenorio, 2009
Phasmoconus Mörch, 1852
Pionoconus Mörch, 1852
Protostrioconus Tucker & Tenorio, 2009
Pseudolilliconus Tucker & Tenorio, 2009
Textilia Swainson, 1840

Subfamily Puncticuliinae Tucker & Tenorio, 2009

Africonus Petuch, 1975
Asprella Schaufuss, 1869
Austroconus Tucker & Tenorio, 2009
Calamiconus Tucker & Tenorio, 2009
Conasprelloides Tucker & Tenorio, 2009
Dauciconus Cotton, 1945
Dendroconus Swainson, 1840
Ductoconus da Motta, 1991
Dyraspis Iredale, 1949
Eremiconus Tucker & Tenorio, 2009
Floraconus Iredale, 1930
Fulgiconus da Motta, 1991
Genuanoconus Tucker & Tenorio, 2009,
Gladioconus Tucker & Tenorio, 2009,
Gradiconus da Motta, 1991
Harmoniconus da Motta, 1991
Hermes Montfort, 1810
Kalloconus da Motta, 1991
Ketyconus da Motta, 1991
Kioconus da Motta, 1991
Kurodaconus Shikama & Habe, 1968
Lamniconus da Motta, 1991
Lautoconus Monterosato, 1923
Leporiconus Iredale, 1930
Lindaconus Petuch, 2003
Lithoconus Mörch, 1852
Lividoconus Wils, 1970
Miliariconus Tucker & Tenorio, 2009
Monteiroconus da Motta, 1991
  † Plagioconus Tucker & Tenorio, 2009
Plicaustraconus Moolenbeek, 2008
Protoconus da Motta, 1991
Pseudonoduloconus Tucker & Tenorio, 2009
Puncticulis Swainson, 1840
Purpuriconus da Motta, 1991
Pyruconus Olsson, 1967
Rhizoconus Mörch, 1852
Rhombiconus Tucker & Tenorio, 2009
Rolaniconus Tucker & Tenorio, 2009
Sciteconus da Motta, 1991
Spuriconus Petuch, 2003
Stellaconus Tucker & Tenorio, 2009
Stephanoconus Mörch, 1852
Strategoconus da Motta, 1991
Tenorioconus Petuch & Drolshagen, 2011
Trovaoconus Tucker & Tenorio, 2009
Turriconus Shikama & Habe, 1968
Varioconus da Motta, 1991
Virgiconus Cotton, 1945
Virroconus Iredale, 1930
Vituliconus da Motta, 1991

Family: Conorbidae Powell, 1842 
(Traditionally considered to be turrids)
 Artemidiconus da Motta, 1991
 Benthofascis Iredale, 1936
  † Conorbis Swainson, 1840

Family: Conilithidae Tucker & Tenorio, 2009 
Subfamily Conilithinae Tucker & Tenorio, 2009

Bathyconus Tucker & Tenorio, 2009
Conasprella Thiele, 1929
  † Conilithes Swainson, 1840
Dalliconus Tucker & Tenorio, 2009
  † Eoconus Tucker & Tenorio, 2009
Fusiconus da Motta, 1991
Globiconus Tucker & Tenorio, 2009
Jaspidiconus Petuch, 2003
Kohniconus Tucker & Tenorio, 2009
Lilliconus Raybaudi Massilia, 1994
Parviconus Cotton & Godfrey, 1932
Perplexiconus Tucker & Tenorio, 2009
Profundiconus Kuroda, 1956
Pseudoconorbis Tucker & Tenorio, 2009
Quasiconus Tucker & Tenorio, 2009
Viminiconus Tucker & Tenorio, 2009
Ximeniconus Emerson & Old, 1962
Yeddoconus Tucker & Tenorio, 2009

Subfamily Californiconinae Tucker & Tenorio, 2009
Californiconus Tucker & Tenorio, 2009

Family: Hemiconidae Tucker & Tenorio, 2009 
  † Hemiconus Cossman, 1889

Family: Taranteconidae Tucker & Tenorio, 2009 
Taranteconus Azuma, 1972
Kenyonia Brazier, 1896

Proposed taxonomy of other Conoidean gastropods
Tucker and Tenorio's proposed classification system for the other clades of Conoidean gastropods (that do not resorb their inner walls), is also based upon morphological, anatomical, and molecular studies, and is shown below:

Superfamily Conoidea Fleming, 1822
(Species in these families lack a radular membrane)
 Family Cryptoconidae Cossman, 1896
 Family Borsoniidae Bellardi, 1875
 Family Raphitomidae Bellardi, 1875
 Subfamily Raphitominae Bellardi, 1875
 Subfamily Mangeliinae P. Fischer, 1883
 Family Clathurellidae H. & A. Adams, 1858
 Subfamily Clathurellinae H. & A. Adams, 1858
 Subfamily Mitromorphinae Casey, 1904

Superfamily Turroidea Swainson, 1840
(Species in these families have a radular membrane and correspond to Puillandre et al.'''s "clade B".)
 Family Clavatulidae J.E. Gray, 1853
 Family Drilliidae Olsson, 1964
 Family Pseudomelatomidae J.P.E. Morrison, 1965
 Family Strictispiridae McLean, 1971
 Family Terebridae H. & A. Adams, 1854 (some species lack a radular membrane)
 Family Turridae H.& A. Adams, 1858
 Subfamily Turrinae H. & A. Adams, 1858
 Subfamily Cochlespirinae Powell, 1942
 Subfamily Crassispirinae McLean, 1971
 Subfamily Zemaciinae Sysoev in Medinskaya & Sysoev, 2003
 Subfamily Zonulispirinae McLean, 1971

Subsequent molecular studies and taxonomic changes
The family Taranteconidae was proposed by Tucker and Tenorio for the unusual species Taranteconus chiangi Azuma, 1972 (equivalent to Conus chiangi), based upon their cladistical analysis.  In 2010, a molecular phylogeny conducted by M. Watkins, et al. found that, based upon molecular studies, Conus chiangi (Azuma, 1972) falls within the Stephanoconus clade with 100% certainty.  Further, Conus chiangi has peptide toxins that are virtually identical to those of the other Stephanoconus species.  The authors opined that the specific peptide toxins were the result of strong natural selection in prey choice, as all Stephanoconus species prey on amphinomid polychaetes (also known as "fire worms").

In their 2009 treatise, John K. Tucker and Manuel J. Tenorio elevated the subfamily Conorbiinae (previously placed within the family Conidae) to the rank of family, based upon a cladistical analysis (as discussed above) which was used to construct phylogenetic trees.  Shortly thereafter, in 2011, Bouchet et al. confirmed the elevation of the subfamily Conorbiinae to the family Conorbidae, based upon a detailed molecular phylogeny of a dataset of molecular sequences (of three gene (DNA) fragments), an analysis that was conducted across the superfamily Conoidea.  Bouchet et al., further recognized Tucker & Tenorio's proposed modified classification, removing many turrid genera from the traditional cone snails, creating the following Conoidean gastropod families: Borsoniidae (which includes Tucker & Tenorio's family Cryptoconidae), Raphitomidae, Mangeliidae, Mitromorphidae, and Clathurellidae.  These studies effectively removed these turrid genera from the family which traditionally represented the cone snails.

Significance of "alternative representations"
As previously mentioned, prior to 2009, all species within the family Conidae were placed in one genus, Conus. In 2009, J.K. Tucker and M.J. Tenorio proposed a classification system for the over 600 recognized species in the family: 3 distinct families and 82 genera for the living species of cone snails. This classification was based upon shell morphology, radular differences, anatomy, physiology, cladistics, with comparisons to molecular (DNA) studies. Published accounts using these multiple genera to explain the diversity within the Conidae include J.K. Tucker & M.J. Tenorio (2009), and Bouchet et al. (2011).  Recent published accounts of the proposed family Conilithidae and its genera  include: Tucker & Stahlschmidt (2010), Tucker, Tenorio & Stahlschmidt (2011),  Bouchet et al. (2011), Puillandre et al. (2011), Tucker & Tenorio (2011), Petuch & Sargent (2011), and Petuch & Drolshage (2011).Tucker, J. K., Tenorio, M. J. & Stahlschmidt, P. (2011) The genus Benthofascis (Gastropoda: Conoidea): a revision with descriptions of new species. Zootaxa 2796:1-14.Petuch, E. J. & Sargent, D. M. (2011) New species of Conidae and Conilithidae (Gastropoda) from the tropical Americas and Philippines. With notes on some poorly-known Floridian species. Visaya 3(3):116-137.

However, in 2011, some experts still preferred to use the traditional classification, where all species are placed in Conus within the single family Conidae.  For example, the November 2011 version of the World Register of Marine Species (WoRMS) used this system. The binomial names of species in the 82 living cone snail genera listed in Tucker & Tenorio 2009 were nonetheless recognized by WoRMS as "alternative representations."  Debate within the scientific community regarding this issue continued, and additional molecular phylogeny studies were carried out in an attempt to clarify the issue.C.M.L. Afonso & M.J. Tenorio (August 2011), A new, distinct endemic Africonus species (Gastropoda, Conidae) from Sao Vicente Island, Cape Verde Archipelago, West Africa, Gloria Maris 50(5): 124-135

See also

References

Further reading
 Kohn A. A. (1992). Chronological Taxonomy of Conus, 1758-1840". Smithsonian Institution Press, Washington and London.
 Monteiro A. (ed.) (2007). The Cone Collector 1: 1-28.
 Berschauer D. (2010). Technology and the Fall of the Mono-Generic Family, The Cone Collector 15: pp. 51–54
 Filmer R.M. (2011) The Cone Collector: Nomenclature and Taxonomy in Living Conidae

External links
  World Register of Marine Species's statement of position: "Traditionally, all cone shells have been included in the Linnean genus Conus. Tucker & Tenorio (2009) have recently proposed an alternative shell- and radula-based classification that recognizes 4 families and 80 genera of cones. In WoRMS, we currently still recognize a single family Conidae (following Puillandre et al. 2011), but Tucker & Tenorio's 80 genera classification is presented as "alternative representation". [P. Bouchet, 14 Aug. 2011]." 
  Gastropods.com: Conidae list of the genera
 Gastropods.com: Conilithidae list of the genera and species

Gastropod taxonomy
Systems of animal taxonomy
Malacological literature
Conidae
Conilithidae